The 2000 Buy.com Tour season ran from February 3 to October 29. The season consisted of 31 official money golf tournaments, of which 30 were played in the United States  The top 15 players on the year-end money list earned their PGA Tour card for 2001.

Schedule
The following table lists official events during the 2000 season.

Money leaders
For full rankings, see 2000 Buy.com Tour graduates.

The money list was based on prize money won during the season, calculated in U.S. dollars. The top 15 players on the tour earned status to play on the 2001 PGA Tour.

Awards

See also
2000 Buy.com Tour graduates

Notes

References

External links
Full Schedule
Rankings and player profiles

Korn Ferry Tour seasons
Buy.com Tour